Morris David Brough Pert (8 September 1947 – 27 April 2010) was a Scottish composer, drummer/percussionist, and pianist who composed in the fields of both contemporary classical and jazz-rock music. His compositions include three symphonies, piano music, chamber and solo instrumental music, choral music and "sonic landscapes" for electronic media; a late major work is "Ankh" for Carnyx and electronics written for eminent trombonist John Kenny.

Biography
Morris Pert was born into a musical family and raised in Arbroath, Scotland where he played variously in percussion, folk (Triad) and rock bands (Vegas) and began to compose. He gained a Trinity College London diploma in piano performance in 1967 and a Bachelor of Music degree from the University of Edinburgh in 1969. He then studied in London on a scholarship at the Royal Academy of Music with Alan Bush (who considered Pert one of his best pupils) and James Blades. He was a prize-winning student, notably the 1970 Royal Philharmonic Society Award for his orchestral work Xumbu-Ata, which was broadcast by the BBC. Pert's other orchestral compositions include Missa Festiva for choir and orchestra, Omega Centauri for chamber orchestra and tape, Sun Dragon for large orchestra and tape, Sonores for solo piano, Andromeda Link for solo violin and tape, Eoastrion Op.30 for E-flat clarinet, piano and tape, The Rising of the Moon for large orchestra (Premiered by Hiroyuki Iwaki and the Waseda University S.O.), The Beltane Rites for orchestra(a BBC commission), The Ancient Kindred for orchestra, Ancient Rites for choir and orchestra, Chromosphere for five players and tape, The Ultimate Decay for tape, The Book of Love for percussion and tape, and incidental music for productions of Macbeth (Young Vic), The Tempest, and Peter Pan (Eden Court).

As a rock musician Pert spent two years (1970–1972) with Japanese percussionist Stomu Yamashta as a member of his ensembles "East Wind" and "Red Buddha Theatre".  The group created a sensation with performances at The Roundhouse in London. In 1971 he founded the group "Come to the Edge" with Robin Thompson and Andrew Powell. After personnel changes in 1973 this band became "Sun Treader" (or "Suntreader") and recorded two albums.  In 1977 Pert joined the jazz-rock band Brand X for their second album, composing three numbers for their Masques album. He stayed with the band, touring extensively, until 1979.

As a session musician he played with many musicians, including Paul McCartney, Andrew Lloyd Webber, John Williams, Kate Bush, Mike Oldfield, Sally Oldfield, Peter Gabriel, Peter Hammill, Jon Anderson, Elvis Costello, Bryan Ferry and Talk Talk. Among his awards are five gold albums, an American ASCAP award and a NARAS Grammy Award nomination. 
 
He also taught piano as an associate professor at Trinity College London, an activity that probably inspired "Moon Dances" and "Voyage in Space".

A pioneering composer, he saw himself as a musical "explorer", adopting modern techniques of sonority and percussion writing, but nevertheless avoided excesses of cerebralism believing sound and emotional communication to be of fundamental importance. His musical language is marked by a degree of rhythmic and metric complexity and a non-ideological use of serial technique that remains open to aspects of tonality. Another important feature of his music is the degree of improvisation required of soloists, generally in response to a pre-recorded tape. The extramusical stimuli were often cosmological, ranging from generally solar or lunar themes to the more specifically astronomical: "Alpha Centauri", "Omega Centauri", "Chromosphere" etc. or inspired by the wisdom, culture and artefacts of the ancient and medieval world, especially his Pictish forebears, but also drawing on Lucretius, Taoism, Carmichael's Carmina Gadelica and the Bible. Composers mentioned on his website were Arne Nordheim, Stockhausen and Iannis Xenakis. Other discernable influences included Tadeusz Baird and Reginald Smith Brindle, as well as the Polish avant-garde.

Pert built a studio in northwest Scotland, where, among other activities, he worked on a projected fourth symphony (of which no remnants are known but which was to be titled "De Situ Albanie") and on solo piano suites; he also explored electronic music and worked with Japanese soprano Natsuko Mineghishi and her ensemble Klang Collective, based in Melbourne and the American musician Bob Warseck.

Pert died on 27 April 2010 at his home in Balchrick, near Kinlochbervie, in Sutherland, Scotland at the age of 62.

Equipment
Pert played drums, congas, tam-tam, timbales, flexatone, vibraslap, marimba, vibraphone, timpani, tabla, gong, bell tree, tambourine, bells, kalimba, shaker, jawbone, assorted percussion and keyboards.

List of compositions (incomplete)

Orchestral
"Xumbu-Ata," 3 pieces for orchestra
"Eilean Donnan Op.17 Elegy and Dance" for Strings and optional timps
"Sun Dragon," symphonic study for large orchestra and tape
Symphony No 1 "The Rising of the Moon" (Dedicated to Robert Hall)
Symphony No 2 "The Beltane Rites" (BBC commission)
Symphony No 3 "The Ancient Kindred"

Vocal/choral
"2 Medieval Lyrics Op.1" (BBC commission)
"4 Japanese Verses Op.2" for soprano and piano
"4 Japanese Lyrics" for soprano and flute
"Epitaphs Op.6" for soprano, piano and percussion
"Missa Festiva" for 2 part female choir and orchestra
"The Ultimate Decay" for voices and electronics
"The Ancient Rites Op.40" for choir and strings

Solo piano/keyboard
"For Janet"
"Suilven Moon"
"Luminos Op.16"
"Moon Dances"
"Sonores," five studies in miniature Op.21
"Fragmenti II" for harpsichord
"Voyage in Space," 20 miniatures
"Stones" or "Standing Stones Suite" (2007), 6 miniatures
"Mountains Suite" (2007), 6 miniatures

Ensemble/chamber/other instrumental
Sonata for clarinet and piano "The Ancient Stone"
"Delphic Fragments" for flute, horn in F, violin, cello, vibraphone and percussion
"Alpha Centauri Op.10" for flute/piccolo, percussion and tape
"Omega Centauri Op.11" for flute, oboe, clarinet, violin, piano, percussion and tape
"Chromosphere Op.24" for 5 players and tape
"Luminos Op.16a" for basset horn/clarinet in Bb and piano
"Andromeda Link" for solo violin and tape
"Eoastrion Op.29" for Eb clarinet and tape
"The Book of Love" for percussion and tape
"Fragmenti I" for clarinet and piano
"Cernunno" for wind quintet
"The Ancient Pattern Op.34"
"Ankh" for Carnyx, trombone and electronics

Rock band
"Zin-Zin" for Sun Treader
"Stardance" for Sun Treader
"Orinocco" for Sun Treader
"From The Region of Capricorn" for Sun Treader
"Eclipse and after" for Sun Treader
"Kuikúru" for Sun Treader
"Sirian Blue" for Sun Treader
"-Ish" for Brand X
"Isis Mourning" for Brand X
"Black Moon" for Brand X
"Deadly Nightshade" for Brand X
"Earth Dance" for Brand X

Electronic
"Aurora"
"Magnificat"
"The Music of Stars"
"Heaven's Song"

Discography

Solo
1975 – Contemporary Clarinet: The Music of Elisabeth Lutyens (Georgina Dobrée (clarinet) & Morris Pert (piano), Chantry Records, LP)
1975 – The Music of Morris Pert: Luminos/Chromosphere/4 Japanese Verses (Chantry Records ABM 21, LP)
c.1976 – The Big Wave (cassette only)
1982 – The Book of Love/Fragmenti I/The Ultimate Decay (Chantry Records CHT007, LP)
1998 – Anthem for the Cruthin (single) – digital download
2001 – The Voyage (recorded with Suntreader—Pert, Peter Robinson and Neville Whitehead —sometime "in the mid-1970s," North by North West Productions NNW002)
2001 – The Music of Stars ("recorded gradually over a period of years as a personal project," North by North West Productions NNW003)
2001 – Elektron Musik (recorded "in the mid-1980s," North by North West Productions NNW004)
2007 - Voyage in Space ("20 pieces for solo piano")
2008 – Desert Dances (Buckyball Records br021)
2011 – Chromosphere/Dorian Terilament/Heaven's Song/The Ultimate Decay – digital download

Session work/band member (partial list)

References

External links
[ Morris Pert] at Allmusic

1947 births
2010 deaths
People from Arbroath
Scottish classical composers
British male classical composers
20th-century classical composers
21st-century classical composers
Alumni of the Royal Academy of Music
Alumni of the University of Edinburgh
Electroacoustic music composers
Scottish drummers
British male drummers
Scottish percussionists
Scottish session musicians
20th-century Scottish musicians
20th-century drummers
21st-century drummers
Conga players
Vibraphonists
Timbaleros
Timpanists
Tabla players
Marimbists
Tambourine players
Isotope (band) members
20th-century British composers
20th-century British male musicians
20th-century British musicians
21st-century British male musicians
Brand X members